The Gilbert and Sullivan Light Opera Company of Long Island is a 501(c)(3) non-profit organization whose mission is the promotion and performance of theater, musical theater and opera, including the works of Gilbert & Sullivan. The company is based in Long Island, New York and was founded in 1954.

History

There had been Gilbert & Sullivan performances on Long Island since at least the 1920s, ranging from school shows to community-theater productions.  But there had never been an ongoing Gilbert & Sullivan company in the area until the Gilbert & Sullivan Workshop was formed in 1953/1954.
 
It was almost inevitable that, if such a group formed, brothers-in-law Norman “Buddy” Packer and Martin “Marty” Waters would be at the heart of it.  Waters had been in London in 1939, attending the Royal Academy of Physicians and Surgeons, and when he came home he brought with him a stack of 78-rpm records—Ruddigore, as recorded by the D’Oyly Carte Opera Company.  He played them for his brother-in-law, and Packer became a lifelong convert.
 
By 1953, when he and his wife, Ruth, moved to Merrick and settled down next door to his brother-in-law, Packer was a confirmed Savoyard.  He’d served as vice president of the New York Gilbert & Sullivan Society, and even produced a televised version of The Mikado in 1949.  When Helen Marx, president of the Camp Avenue School PTA, asked him if he could organize a fundraiser, his thoughts turned—as they so often did—to Gilbert & Sullivan.
 
Initially the idea was for Packer and Waters to run an adult-education class in G&S that would culminate in a performance of The Mikado.  But when Packer recruited an old friend, Sally Buckstone of Oceanside, to sing, the seeds of a new group were planted.  Buckstone was a fine singer but also a talented director, and when The Mikado was presented in Spring 1954, it was so well-received that momentum took over.
 
The Gilbert & Sullivan Workshop of Long Island was born the next year, when the same team presented H.M.S. Pinafore in Merrick, and then The Pirates of Penzance in 1956.  The Camp Avenue PTA had benefited so much from The Mikado and its successors that soon other schools were inquiring into the possibility of getting performances of their own.  Buckstone, Packer and Waters were eager to expand their season and broaden their performer base, and by the early 1960s the Workshop was a full-fledged touring group, performing throughout Nassau County, and making gradual incursions into Suffolk County and Queens as well.
 
During those same years, the Workshop expanded its repertoire to include Trial by Jury, Patience, Iolanthe and Ruddigore.  It would not be until 1975 that it performed The Gondoliers for the first time, however, and not until 1979 that it first staged The Sorcerer.
 
Buckstone, Packer and Waters continued to be mainstays of the group as it moved into the 1970s.  In 1977 the Workshop left its longtime home at the Old Mill Road School in Merrick, taking up residence at the Roland Chatterton School in Merrick, which remains its Tuesday-night home to the present day.
 
The 1980s brought major changes to the group, beginning with its name:  In 1980, due to a consensus that the group had evolved into something larger in scope and more professional than the word “Workshop” suggested, the group’s name was officially changed to The Gilbert & Sullivan Light Opera Company of Long Island.
 
Two years later the first of the three founding members left the group, as Norman “Buddy” Packer retired to Coconut Creek, Fla., where he still lives today at 85.  Martin “Marty” Waters performed his final show with the Company in 1984, and a few years later moved south as well; today, at 86, he lives with his wife, Billie, in Baton Rouge, La.  Sally Buckstone continued to direct with the Company until the mid-1990s, before relocating to Pembroke Pines, Fla.
 
The most striking aspect of the 1980s was the development of the Yiddish division of the Company in 1984.  Initially a novelty fund-raiser, Der Shirtz (a 30-minute Yiddish version of H.M.S. Pinafore) blossomed into a whole new group.  Under the leadership of longtime Company stalwarts Al Grand, Bob Tartell and Elaine Lerner, and directed by Sally Buckstone, what eventually became the Gilbert & Sullivan Yiddish Light Opera Company of Long Island developed Der Yiddisher Pinafore, Di Yam Gazlonim  (Pirates of Penzance) and Der Yiddisher Mikado, Yiddish versions of the beloved “Big Three” Savoy operas. The group's critically acclaimed productions melded Victorian satire with Jewish humor, while preserving the lovely music and spirit of the original works.  Jewish experiences and idioms were woven into the original plots, which added a rich dimension to the existing humor and wit.  Hearing Britishisms coming out as Yiddishisms made people roar with laughter!  All three adaptations played to sold-out audiences all over the United States, Canada and in London, England.  Touring nationally and internationally, it marked out a unique corner of the Gilbert & Sullivan universe and made it its own.
 
Two landmarks defined the 1990s for the Company:  One was the development of the Gilbert & Sullivan Light Opera Orchestra of Long Island, under the direction first of founding music director Raymond J. Osnato and then several other conductors.  The Company had occasionally recruited orchestras for performances in the 1960s and 1970s, but had never had an orchestra of its own.  Beginning in 1992, however, the Company made it a priority to develop its own orchestra, beginning with a tiny ensemble of six and slowly growing with the passing years.  Many of the orchestra members have returned again and again to the Light Opera Orchestra, which is now in its 12th year.
 
1992 also saw the launching of “The Savoy Project: or, Gilbert & Sullivan from A to Z.”  Spurred by a desire to try new projects and convinced that it had been depending too much upon “the Big Three,” the Company undertook a complete cycle of the works of Gilbert & Sullivan, beginning with Princess Ida in 1992 and concluding in 2004 with The Mikado.  The Project, which has been an overwhelming success, has featured the Long Island premieres of four operas—Princess Ida, The Yeomen of the Guard, Utopia, Limited and The Grand Duke, as well as of the Sullivan/Stephenson operetta The Zoo.
 
In 1995 the Company presented the world premiere of Gayden Wren’s A Gilbert & Sullivan Christmas Carol.  The premiere sold out, prompting the Company to revive it as a season fund-raiser for several years thereafter.  The show, which tells the Charles Dickens story with new lyrics set to Gilbert & Sullivan songs, went on to score a hit Off-Broadway in 2001, and has now been staged more than 50 times throughout the United States and by groups in Canada, Great Britain and Macedonia.

References

External links

Musical groups established in 1954
New York (state) opera companies
Gilbert and Sullivan performing groups
Musical groups from Long Island